Benjamin Rush State Park is a  Pennsylvania state park in Philadelphia, Philadelphia County, Pennsylvania, in the United States. The park is undeveloped and is the site of community gardens, believed to be one of the largest in the world. The park is home to the Northeast Radio Controlled Airplane Club.  Benjamin Rush State Park is in Northeast Philadelphia at the intersection of Southampton Road and Roosevelt Boulevard (U.S. Route 1). The northern boundary of the park is formed by Poquessing Creek. There are several acres of woodlands along the creek bank. A proposal map show plans to connect the park with Fairmount Park. Other proposed improvements included hiking trails, parking facilities, and a reforestation project. The community gardens and airfield for the radio-controlled aircraft would remain.

See also

Benjamin Rush
List of parks in Philadelphia

Nearby state parks
The following state parks are within  of Benjamin Rush State Park:
Bull's Island Recreation Area (New Jersey)
Delaware Canal State Park (Bucks and Northampton Counties )
Delaware and Raritan Canal State Park (New Jersey)
Evansburg State Park (Montgomery County)
Fort Washington State Park (Montgomery County) 
Neshaminy State Park (Bucks County)
Nockamixon State Park (Bucks County)
Norristown Farm Park (Montgomery County)
Ralph Stover State Park (Bucks County)
Rancocas State Park (New Jersey)
Ridley Creek State Park (Delaware County)
Tyler State Park (Bucks County)
Washington Crossing State Park (New Jersey)

References

External links

  

State parks of Pennsylvania
Parks in Philadelphia
Protected areas established in 1975
Northeast Philadelphia
1975 establishments in Pennsylvania
Protected areas of Philadelphia